The Spectrum is one of the oldest student publications in the Philippines; its history dates back to 1956. Its bimonthly newspaper, magazine, and annual literary folio Scribe are published by the students of the University of St. La Salle in Bacolod.

History

Early years
In the school year 1956-1957 The Spectrum was established in an exclusive school for boys. That time, the then La Salle College was populated by less than 1,000 from preparatory kindergarten to undergraduate level. The Spectrum came out once every quarter in tabloid form, printed on white paper which was the standard during that time. Although the high school and college shared the same flag for their publications, they had separate issues prepared by their 30-member staff. Oscar L. Hilado (college) and Mario Guariňo (high school) were the first editors-in-chief of The Spectrum. When La Salle opened its doors to female students in 1966, Lourdes Carisma Barredo became the first female editor-in-chief of the publication three years later.

The Spectrum joined the annual Western Visayas College Press Conference and Awards (COPRE) in 1976. COPRE was and is still being sponsored by the Philippine Information Agency under the Office of the President of Philippines.

The first issue of The Spectrum magazine came out when the Fundamentals of Journalism class of 1978 was able to produce it as part of their semestral requirements. The editor-in-chief then was Isabel C. Urra. Two years later, The Spectrum won its first COPRE awards: Western Visayas’ Second Best Magazine and Second Best Filipino and Literary pages.

Post-Marcos years
Right after the ousting of then-president Ferdinand Marcos, The Spectrum produced issues filled with post-Marcos-related articles and pictures of the scenario in the province. In the middle of the 1990s, Scope, The Spectrum’s investigative arm was created, first published as a separate newsletter. Scope aimed to instigate change through investigative journalism so as to improve the university’s academic system.

In 1991–1993, the publication won the COPRE Region 6’s Best Newspaper for three consecutive years paving the way for The Spectrum to grab the most coveted Graciano Lopez-Jaena Award. To accommodate literary pieces in prose and poetry, The Spectrum released its first literary folio – Scribe1995.

After the 1990s

In the '90s, The Spectrum won first place awards in COPRE's categories for newspaper and magazine, besting publications from colleges and universities all over the region.

In 2004, it became the Grand Prize winner of the National Campus Investigative Journalism Award sponsored by The Varsitarian, the official student publication of the University of Santo Tomas. The award was for the Scope section in the July 2004 magazine that featured the “Probing into the STM Program” investigative piece. The article created an impact on the university's policy regarding the Student Team Managers Program that resulted in its abolition.

In 2004–2005 The Spectrum and its writers amassed a total of 31 major and minor COPRE awards and recognition. In February 2005, the Spectrum Negroswide Campus Journalism Fellowship had its debut. It was participated in by various college and high school campus journalists all throughout Negros Occidental. A year later, The Spectrum fellowship was held again; this time, student journalists from Negros Oriental’s prominent schools like Silliman University and Negros Oriental State University came to participate.

The Spectrum at 50

The publication celebrated its 50th anniversary in the school year 2006–2007 with Ms. Krysl Marie E. Santiago as editor-in-chief. The holding of the 3rd Annual Spectrum Campus Journalism Fellowship was the main event. The fellowship that gathered campus journalists from all over Visayas had Philippine Daily Inquirer columnist and ABS-CBN News Channel host Manuel Quezon III, Palanca awardee and performance poet Angelo Suarez and Peace Journalism Network National Coordinator Jean Lee Patindol, who was the 1988-89 editor-in-chief of The Spectrum, as resource speakers.

The Spectrum in the 2000s
In the 2000s, The Spectrum reinvented itself as more than just a publication as it ventured into other forms of media. It now holds the title the Official Student Media Corps of the University of St. La Salle.

On September 27–29, 2007 under Jeffrey Ordaniel as editor-in-chief The Spectrum expanded its annual fellowship and went national. The Spectrum Fellowship was held at Santuario De La Salle, Bacolod City. The event invited several of the country’s top personalities in the field of writing and journalism to share their expertise and experiences. Among them were ABS-CBN News Channel’s "The Explainer" and Philippine Daily Inquirer columnist Manuel L. Quezon III for opinion writing, Mother Earth Foundation vice chair Chin Chin Gutierrez for the role of media in environmental consciousness, UP Institute for Creative Writing director Carmelo “Vim” Nadera for Filipino writing and patriotism in writing and journalism, Palanca Awardee Angelo Suarez for creative writing and performance poetry, Philippine Center for Investigative Journalism training officer Yvonne Chua for investigative reporting, multi-awarded children's book author Jean Lee Patindol for peace and conflict journalism, and women's rights advocate Atty. Rowena Guanzon for gender-sensitive journalism.

The fellowship gathered the most senior Filipino young writers, campus journalists, artists and advisers from campus-based publications all over the Philippines.

In the same school year, The Spectrum hosted the 4th National Lasallian Schools Press Conference (LSPCon 2008). The event featured topics such as peace and conflict journalism, gender-sensitive communications, and nationalism in writing and journalism, among others.

LSPCon 2008 again invited Vim Nadera, two-time Salanga Grand Prize Winner for Children's Literature Jean Lee Patindol, and Palanca awardee and performance poet Angelo Suarez, joined by former magazine editor Jessica Zafra, among others.

Truth Beyond Knowing: The Spectrum in the 2010s

2015 

Monica Louise Trinidad M. Cueto, former Editor-in-Chief, along with the editorial board, started The Spectrum's first ever journalism seminar titled Truth Beyond Knowing which was held at the USLS. It invited different junior high school publications residing in Negros Occidental.

During the College Press Conference and Awards 2015, The Spectrum magazine October issue themed "Call of the Void" bagged all the major awards in the magazine category: 1st place - Best Magazine, 1st place - Best Magazine Cover Design & 1st place - Best Magazine Layout.

2016 

RJ Nichole L. Ledesma, fellow for 2016 Silliman University National Writers Workshop in Poetry, was the former Editor-in-Chief of the publication.

Scribe Volume 19: Tales of the Sewer was launched on July 26, 2016, at the Museo De La Salle Bacolod. It was the first public launching of Scribe (the official literary folio of the publication) since its birth in 1995.

2017 

Andrea Nicole C. Farol, IWAG Awardee in the year 2018, was the 62nd Editor-in-Chief of the publication.

2018 

Under the leadership of Joshua Martin P. Guanco, The Spectrum bagged numerous awards during the 2018 College Press Conference.

2019 

From 2019 to 2020, The Spectrum was led by Hezron Pios.

On November 16, 2019, the publication collaborated with Rappler for #MoveBacolod held at MM Audi A in the university.

The event themed Social Good in the Digital Age invited participants all over the region.

The Spectrum amidst COVID-19 
The Spectrum is about to reach its 65th volume in the academic year 2020–2021. With this, the publication sees itself as one of the frontrunners in campus journalism not only in Negros Occidental but all over the Philippines.

2020 
The Spectrum hosts the annual Lasallian Schools Press Conference.

Awards

College Press Conference (COPRE) 2019  

Best Newspaper/Tabloid - 1st Place
Best Wall Newspaper - 4th Place for Sandigan
Best Literary Folio - 1st Place for The Scribe
Best Online Newsletter - 1st Place
Best Newspaper Layout - 2nd Place
Best College Newsletter - 1st Place
Best News Page - 1st Place
Best Editorial Page - 2nd Place

Publications

2015 

 The Spectrum Newspaper, August–September 2015 (Volume 60, No. 3)
 Dagway, August–September 2015 (Volume 60, No. 3)
 The Spectrum Magazine: Call of the Void, October 2015 (Volume 60, No. 4)

2016 

 The Spectrum Newspaper, May–June 2016 (Volume 61, No. 2)
 The Spectrum Newspaper, July 2016 (Volume 61, No. 3)
 The Spectrum Magazine: Otherness, August 2016 (Volume 61, No. 4)
 The Spectrum Newspaper, August 2016 (Volume 61, No. 5)
 The Class 2016, October 2016 (Volume 61, No. 7)
 The Spectrum Newspaper, September–October 2016 (Volume 61, No. 8)
 The Spectrum E-Newsletter, November 2016 (Volume 61, No. 9)
 The Scribe: Tales from the Sewer, August 2016 (Volume 19)

2017 

 The Scribe: The Art of Flight, March 2017 (Volume 20)
 The Spectrum Newspaper, July–August 2017 (Volume 62, No. 2)
 The Class 2017, September 2017 (Volume 62, No. 3)
 The Spectrum Newspaper, September–October 2017 (Volume 62, No. 4)
 The Spectrum Magazine: Invictus
 The Spectrum E-Newsletter, July–August 2017 (Volume 62, No. 7)

2018 

 Joust, February 2018 (Volume 1)
 The Spectrum E-Newsletter, October 2018 (Volume 63, No. 6)
 The Spectrum Magazine: The Great Acceleration, November 2018 (Volume 63, No. 7)

2019 

 The Class 2019, June 2019 (Volume 64, No. 1)
 The Spectrum Newspaper, May–June 2019 (Volume 64, No. 2)
 The Spectrum Newspaper, July–August  2019 (Volume 64, No. 3)
 The Spectrum Newsletter, November 2019 (Volume 64, No. 4)
 The Spectrum Newspaper, September–October  2019 (Volume 64, No. 5)
 The Spectrum E-Newsletter, November 2019 (Volume 64, No. 6)
 The Spectrum Wall News: Sandigan, October 2019 (Volume 64, No. 7)
 The Spectrum Magazine: Ego Death, November 2019 (Volume 64, No. 8)

Events and Live Coverage

2019 

 Lasallian Week (L-Week) 2019
 Lasallian Frosh Awareness Program
 #MoveBacolod
 3rd Literary Festival
 LSPCon 2020

The Spectrum Editors-in-Chief 

 Oscar Hilado, 1956–1957
 Jean Lee Patindol, 1988–1989
 RJ Espera, 2005
 Krystel Marie Santiago, 2005–2007
 Jeffrey Ordaniel, 2007–2008
 Jamie Bentinganan & Neslie Faith Sianson, 2008–2009
 Kurt Tee, 2009–2010
 Celine Chua, 2010–2011
 Epi Ma. Kassandra Dajao, 2011–2012
 Jayrick Aguirre, 2012–2013
 Coleen Edrea Ematong & Adely Grace Tomaro, 2013–2014
 Adely Grace Tomaro, 2014–2015
 Monica Louise Cueto, 2015–2016
 RJ Nichole Ledesma, 2016–2017
 Andrea Nicole Farol, 2017–2018
 Joshua Martin Guanco, 2018–2019
 Hezron Pios, 2019–2020
 Lance Christian Juarez, 2020–2021
 Kynah Rhea Fuentes, 2021–2022
Patrick Billojan, 2022–present

Notable alumni 

 Oscar Hilado, first editor-in-chief (1956–57), now chairman of Phinma Group and the Philippines' 27th richest man. 
 Jean Lee Patindol, 1988-89 editor-in-chief, two-time Salanga Awardee for Children's Literature, national coordinator of Peace and Conflict-Sensitive Journalism Network-Philippines; her two children's books are available in the US and the Philippines. 
 Joel Torre, former sports writer of The Spectrum, now a renowned Filipino actor. 
 Rafael Coscolluela, former governor of Negros Occidental.

References

External links
 The Spectrum official website
 The Spectrum online message boards
 University of St. La Salle
 USLS - Student Inquiry

Lasallian student publications
Student newspapers published in the Philippines
University of St. La Salle